The 1926 Kentucky Wildcats football team was an American football team that represented the University of Kentucky as a member of the Southern Conference (SoCon) during the 1926 season. In its third and final season under head coach Fred J. Murphy, Kentucky compiled an overall record of 2–6–1 with a mark of 1–4–1 in conference play, tying for 19th place in the SoCon.

Schedule

References

Kentucky
Kentucky Wildcats football seasons
Kentucky Wildcats football